Mean What You Say, released in 1991 on CGI Records, is a gospel music album by American contemporary gospel music group Witness. This would be the last album to feature original founding members Tina Brooks and Yolanda Harris, who departed after the album's release. Gospel singer Liz Lee stepped in with LouAnn Stewart to replace Brooks and Harris to promote the album. Lee would then depart to the group and be permanently replaced by Lisa Page's sister Laeh Page.

The album earned a Grammy Award nomination for Best Contemporary Soul Gospel Album.

Track listing
"Perfect Peace"
"Yesterday Is Gone"
"Mean What You Say"
"There's Someone"
"Yes I Will"
"Would Not Change a Thing"
"Still in the Middle"
"Thoughtful"
"Good Love and Peace of Mind"
"Lately"
"Go Tell It on the Mountain"
"Living Beneath Your Privilege"

Personnel
Lisa Page Brooks: Vocals
Tina Brooks: Vocals
Diane Campbell: Vocals
Yolanda Harris: Vocals

References

1991 albums
Witness (gospel group) albums